The Eurasian tree sparrow (Passer montanus) is a passerine bird in the sparrow family with a rich chestnut crown and nape, and a black patch on each pure white cheek. The sexes are similarly plumaged, and young birds are a duller version of the adult. This sparrow breeds over most of temperate Eurasia and Southeast Asia, where it is known as the tree sparrow, and it has been introduced elsewhere including the United States, where it is known as the Eurasian tree sparrow or German sparrow to differentiate it from the native unrelated American tree sparrow. Although several subspecies are recognised, the appearance of this bird varies little across its extensive range.

The Eurasian tree sparrow's untidy nest is built in a natural cavity, a hole in a building or the disused nest of a European magpie or white stork. The typical clutch is five or six eggs which hatch in under two weeks. This sparrow feeds mainly on seeds, but invertebrates are also consumed, particularly during the breeding season. As with other small birds, infection by parasites and diseases, and predation by birds of prey take their toll, and the typical life span is about two years.

The Eurasian tree sparrow is widespread in the towns and cities of eastern Asia, but in Europe it is a bird of lightly wooded open countryside, with the house sparrow breeding in the more urban areas. The Eurasian tree sparrow's extensive range and large population ensure that it is not endangered globally, but there have been large declines in western European populations, in part due to changes in farming practices involving increased use of herbicides and loss of winter stubble fields. In eastern Asia and western Australia, this species is sometimes viewed as a pest, although it is also widely celebrated in oriental art.

Description
The adult's crown and nape are rich chestnut, and there is a kidney-shaped black ear patch on each pure white cheek; the chin, throat, and the area between the bill and throat are black. The upperparts are light brown, streaked with black, and the brown wings have two distinct narrow white bars. The legs are pale brown, and the bill is lead-blue in summer, becoming almost black in winter.

This sparrow is distinctive even within its genus in that it has no plumage differences between the sexes; the juvenile also resembles the adult, although the colours tend to be duller. Its contrasting face pattern makes this species easily identifiable in all plumages; the smaller size and brown, not grey, crown are additional differences from the male house sparrow. Adult and juvenile Eurasian tree sparrows undergo a slow complete moult in the autumn, and show an increase in body mass despite a reduction in stored fat. The change in mass is due to an increase in blood volume to support active feather growth, and a generally higher water content in the body.

The Eurasian tree sparrow has no true song, but its vocalisations include an excited series of tschip calls given by unpaired or courting males. Other monosyllabic chirps are used in social contacts, and the flight call is a harsh teck. A study comparing the vocalisations of the introduced Missouri population with those of birds from Germany showed that the US birds had fewer shared syllable types (memes) and more structure within the population than the European sparrows. This may have resulted from the small size of the founding North American population and a consequent loss of genetic diversity.

Taxonomy

The Old World sparrow genus Passer is a group of small passerine birds that is believed to have originated in Africa, and which contains 15–25 species depending on the authority. Its members are typically found in open, lightly wooded, habitats, although several species, notably the house sparrow (P. domesticus) have adapted to human habitations. They are primarily ground-feeding seed-eaters, although they also consume invertebrates, especially when breeding. Genetic studies show that the Eurasian tree sparrow diverged from the other Eurasian members of its genus relatively early, before the speciation of the house, plain-backed and Spanish sparrows. The Eurasian species is not closely related to the American tree sparrow (Spizelloides arborea), which is in a different family, the New World sparrows.

The Eurasian tree sparrow's binomial name is derived from two Latin words: passer, "sparrow", and montanus, "of the mountains" (from mons "mountain"). The Eurasian tree sparrow was first described by Carl Linnaeus in his 1758 Systema Naturae as Fringilla montana, but, along with the house sparrow, it was soon moved from the finches (family Fringillidae) into the new genus Passer created by French zoologist Mathurin Jacques Brisson in 1760. The Eurasian tree sparrow's common name is given because of its preference of tree holes for nesting. This name, and the scientific name montanus, do not appropriately describe this species's habitat preferences: the German name Feldsperling ("field sparrow") comes closer to doing so.

Subspecies

This species varies little in appearance across its large range, and the differences between the seven extant subspecies recognised by Clement are slight. At least 15 other subspecies have been proposed, but they are considered to be intermediates of the listed subspecies.
 The European tree sparrow (P. m. montanus), the nominate subspecies, ranges across Europe except for the southwestern Iberian Peninsula, southern Greece and the former Yugoslavia. It also breeds in Asia east to the Lena River and south to the northern regions of Turkey, the Caucasus, Kazakhstan and Mongolia and in North Korea.
 The Caucasian tree sparrow (P. m. transcaucasicus), described by Sergei Aleksandrovich Buturlin in 1906, breeds from the southern regions of the Caucasus east to northern Iran. It is duller and greyer than the nominate subspecies.
 The Afghan tree sparrow (P. m. dilutus), described by Charles Wallace Richmond in 1856, is resident in extreme northeastern Iran, northern Pakistan and northwestern India. It also occurs further north, from Uzbekistan and Tajikistan east to China. Compared to P. m. montanus, it is paler, with sandy-brown upperparts.
 The Tibetan tree sparrow (P. m. tibetanus), the largest subspecies by size, was described by Stuart Baker in 1925. It is found in the northern Himalayas, from Nepal east through Tibet to northwestern China. It resembles P. m. dilutus, but is darker.
 P. m. saturatus, described by Leonhard Hess Stejneger in 1885, breeds in Sakhalin, the Kuril Islands, Japan, Taiwan and South Korea. It is deeper brown than the nominate subspecies and has a larger bill.
 P. m. malaccensis, described by Alphonse Dubois in 1885, is found from the southern Himalayas east to Hainan and Indonesia. It is a dark-coloured subspecies, like P. m. saturatus, but is smaller and more heavily streaked on its upperparts.
 P. m. hepaticus, described by Sidney Dillon Ripley in 1948, breeds from northeastern Assam to northwestern Burma. It is similar in appearance to P. m. saturatus, but redder on its head and upperparts.

Distribution and habitat

The Eurasian tree sparrow's natural breeding range comprises most of temperate Europe and Asia south of about latitude 68°N (north of this the summers are too cold, with July average temperatures below ) and through Southeast Asia to Java and Bali. It formerly bred in the Faroes, Malta and Gozo. In South Asia it is found mainly in the temperate zone. It is sedentary over most of its extensive range, but northernmost breeding populations migrate south for the winter, and small numbers leave southern Europe for North Africa and the Middle East. The eastern subspecies P. m. dilutus reaches coastal Pakistan in winter and thousands of birds of this race move through eastern China in autumn.

The Eurasian tree sparrow has been introduced outside its native range, but has not always become established, possibly due to competition with the house sparrow. It was introduced successfully to Sardinia, eastern Indonesia, the Philippines and Micronesia, but introductions to New Zealand and Bermuda did not take root. Ship-carried birds colonised Borneo. This sparrow has occurred as a natural vagrant to Gibraltar, Tunisia, Algeria, Egypt, Israel, the United Arab Emirates, Morocco and Iceland.
In North America, a population of about 15,000 birds has become established around St. Louis and neighbouring parts of Illinois and southeastern Iowa. These sparrows are descended from 12 birds imported from Germany and released in late April 1870 as part of a project to enhance the native North American avifauna. The American population is sometimes referred to as the "German sparrow", to distinguish it from both the native American tree sparrow species and the much more widespread "English" house sparrow.

In Australia, the Eurasian tree sparrow is present in Melbourne, towns in central and northern Victoria and some centres in the Riverina region of New South Wales. It is a prohibited species in Western Australia, where it often arrives on ships from Southeast Asia.

In Europe, it is frequently found on coasts with cliffs, in empty buildings, in pollarded willows along slow water courses, or in open countryside with small isolated patches of woodland. The Eurasian tree sparrow shows a strong preference for nest-sites near wetland habitats, and avoids breeding on intensively managed mixed farmland.

When the Eurasian tree sparrow and the larger house sparrow occur in the same area, the house sparrow generally breeds in urban areas while the smaller Eurasian tree sparrow nests in the countryside. Where trees are in short supply, as in Mongolia, both species may utilise man-made structures as nest sites. The Eurasian tree sparrow is rural in Europe, but is an urban bird in eastern Asia; in southern and central Asia, both Passer species may be found around towns and villages. In parts of the Mediterranean, such as Italy, both the tree and the Italian or Spanish sparrows may be found in settlements. In Australia, the Eurasian tree sparrow is largely an urban bird, and it is the house sparrow which utilises more natural habitats.

Behaviour and ecology

Breeding

The Eurasian tree sparrow reaches breeding maturity within a year from hatching, and typically builds its nest in a cavity in an old tree or rock face. Some nests are not in holes as such, but are built among roots of overhanging gorse or similar bush. Roof cavities in houses may be used, and in the tropics, the crown of a palm tree or the ceiling of a verandah can serve as a nest site.  This species will breed in the disused domed nest of a European magpie, or an active or unused stick nest of a large bird such as the white stork, white-tailed eagle, osprey, black kite or grey heron. It will sometimes attempt to take over the nest of other birds that breed in holes or enclosed spaces, such as the barn swallow, house martin, sand martin or European bee-eater.

Pairs may breed in isolation or in loose colonies, and will readily use nest boxes. In a Spanish study, boxes made from a mixture of wood and concrete (woodcrete) had a much higher occupancy rate than wooden boxes (76.5% versus 33.5%), and birds nesting in woodcrete sites had earlier clutches, a shorter incubation period and more breeding attempts per season. Clutch size and chick condition did not differ between nest box types, but reproductive success was higher in woodcrete, perhaps because the synthetic nests were 1.5 °C warmer than their wooden counterparts.

The male calls from near the nest site in spring to proclaim ownership and attract a mate. He may also carry nest material into the nest hole. The display and nest building is repeated in autumn. The preferred locations for the autumn display are old Eurasian tree sparrow nests, particularly those where nestlings had hatched. Empty nest boxes, and sites used by house sparrows or other hole nesting birds, such as tits, pied flycatchers or common redstarts, are rarely used for the autumn display.

The untidy nest is composed of hay, grass, wool or other material and lined with feathers, which improve the thermal insulation. A complete nest consists of three layers; base, lining and dome. The eggs are incubated by both parents for 12–13 days before the altricial, naked chicks hatch, and a further 15–18 days elapse before they fledge. Two or three broods may be raised each year; birds breeding in colonies produce more eggs and fledglings from their first broods than solitary pairs, but the reverse is true for second and third clutches. Females which copulate frequently tend to lay more eggs and have a shorter incubation time, so within-pair mating may be an indicator of the pairs' reproductive ability. There is a significant level of promiscuity; in a Hungarian study, more than 9% of chicks were sired by extra-pair males, and 20% of the broods contained at least one extra-pair young.

Hybridisation between the Eurasian tree sparrow and the house sparrow has been recorded in many parts of the world with male hybrids tending to resemble the Eurasian tree sparrow while females have more similarities with the house sparrow. A breeding population in the Eastern Ghats of India, said to be introduced, may also hybridise with house sparrows. On at least one occasion a mixed pair has resulted in fertile young. A wild hybridisation with the resident sparrows of Malta, which are intermediate between the Spanish sparrow (P. hispaniolensis) and Italian sparrows (P. italiae), was recorded in Malta in 1975.

Feeding

The Eurasian tree sparrow is a predominantly seed and grain eating bird which feeds on the ground in flocks, often with house sparrows, finches, or buntings. It eats weed seeds, such as chickweeds and goosefoot, spilled grain, and it may also visit feeding stations, especially for peanuts. It will also feed on invertebrates, especially during the breeding season when the young are fed mainly on animal food; it takes insects, woodlice, millipedes, centipedes, spiders and harvestmen.

Adults use a variety of wetlands when foraging for invertebrate prey to feed nestlings, and aquatic sites play a key role in providing adequate diversity and availability of suitable invertebrate prey to allow successful chick rearing throughout the long breeding season of this multi-brooded species. Large areas of formerly occupied farmland no longer provide these invertebrate resources due to the effects of intensive farming, and the availability of supplementary seed food within  of the nest-site does not influence nest-site choice, or affect the number of young raised.

In winter, seed resources are most likely to be a key limiting factor. At this time of year, individuals in a flock form linear dominance hierarchies, but there is no strong relation between the size of the throat patch and position in that hierarchy. This is in contrast to the house sparrow; in that species, fights to establish dominance are reduced by the display of the throat patch, the size of which acts as a signalling "badge" of fitness.  Although there is evidence that the black throat patch of male, but not female, tree sparrows predicts fighting success in foraging flocks.

The risk of predation affects feeding strategies. A study showed increased distance between shelter and a food supply meant that birds visited a feeder in smaller flocks, spent less time on it and were more vigilant when far from shelter. Sparrows can feed as "producers", searching for food directly, or "scroungers", just joining other flock members who have already discovered food. Scrounging was 30% more likely at exposed feeding sites, although this is not due to increased anti-predator vigilance. A possible explanation is that riskier places are used by individuals with lower fat reserves.

Prey

Predators of the Eurasian tree sparrow include a variety of accipiters, falcons and owls, such as the Eurasian sparrowhawk, common kestrel, little owl, and sometimes long-eared owl and white stork. It does not appear to be at an increased risk of predation during its autumn moult, despite having fewer flight feathers at that time. Nests may be raided by Eurasian magpies, jays, least weasels, rats, cats, and constricting snakes such as the horseshoe whip snake.

Many species of bird lice are present on the birds and in their nests, and mites of the genus Knemidocoptes have been known to infest populations, resulting in lesions on the legs and toes. Parasitisation of nestlings by Protocalliphora blow-fly larvae is a significant factor in nestling mortality. Egg size does not influence nestling mortality, but chicks from large eggs grow faster.

Eurasian tree sparrows are also subject to bacterial and viral infections. Bacteria have been shown to be an important factor in the failure of eggs to hatch and in nestling mortality, and mass deaths due to Salmonella infection have been noted in Japan. Avian malaria parasites have been found in the blood of many populations, and birds in China were found to harbour a strain of H5N1 that was highly virulent to chickens.

The immune response of Eurasian tree sparrows is less robust than that of the house sparrow and has been proposed as a factor in the greater invasive potential of the latter. The house sparrow and Eurasian tree sparrow are the most frequent victims of roadkill on the roads of Central, Eastern and Southern Europe. The maximum recorded age is 13.1 years, but three years is a typical lifespan.

Conservation status

Although the population is declining, the species is not believed to approach the thresholds for the population decline criterion of the IUCN Red List (that is, declining more than 30% in 10 years or three generations). For these reasons, the species' conservation status is evaluated at the global level as being of Least Concern.

Although the Eurasian tree sparrow has been expanding its range in Fennoscandia and eastern Europe, populations have been declining in much of western Europe, a trend reflected in other farmland birds such as the skylark, corn bunting and northern lapwing. From 1980 to 2003, common farmland bird numbers fell by 28%. The collapse in populations seems to have been particularly severe in Great Britain, where there was a 95% decline between 1970 and 1998, and Ireland, which had only 1,000–1,500 pairs in the late 1990s. In the British Isles, such declines may be due to natural fluctuations, to which Eurasian tree sparrows are known to be prone. Breeding performance has improved substantially as population sizes have decreased, suggesting that decreases in productivity were not responsible for the decline and that survival was the critical factor. The large decline in Eurasian tree sparrow numbers is probably the result of agricultural intensification and specialisation, particularly the increased use of herbicides and a trend towards autumn-sown crops (at the expense of spring-sown crops that produce stubble fields in winter). The change from mixed to specialised farming and the increased use of insecticides has reduced the amount of insect food available for nestlings.

Relationships with humans

The Eurasian tree sparrow is seen as a pest in some areas. In Australia, it damages many cereal and fruit crops and spoils cereal crops, animal feed and stored grain with its droppings. Quarantine rules prohibit the transport of this species into Western Australia.

The Paramount leader of China, Mao Zedong attempted in April 1958 to reduce crop damage by Eurasian tree sparrows, which was estimated to be  of grain per bird each year, by mobilising millions of people and many scarecrows to drive the birds to death by exhaustion. Although successful at reducing the sparrow population, the "Four Pests campaign" had overlooked the numbers of locusts and other insect pests consumed by the birds. Crop yields collapsed, exacerbating a famine which led to the deaths of 30 million people between 1959 and 1961. The Eurasian tree sparrow's consumption of insects has led to its use in agriculture to control fruit tree pests and the common asparagus beetle (Crioceris aspergi).

The Eurasian tree sparrow has long been depicted in Chinese and Japanese art, often on a plant spray or in a flying flock, and representations by oriental artists including Hiroshige have featured on the postage stamps of Antigua and Barbuda, Central African Republic, China, and the Gambia. More straightforward illustrations were used on the stamps of Belarus, Belgium, Cambodia, Estonia, and Taiwan. The fluttering of the bird gave rise to a traditional Japanese dance, the Suzume Odori, developed in Sendai, which was depicted by artists such as Hokusai.

In the Philippines, where it is one of several species referred to as maya, and is sometimes specifically referred to as the "mayang simbahan" ("church maya" or "church sparrow"), the Eurasian tree sparrow is the most common bird in the cities. Many urban Filipinos confuse it with the former national bird of the Philippines, the black-headed munia –  also called a maya, but specifically differentiated in folk taxa as the "mayang pula" ("red maya").

References

Works cited

Further reading

External links 

 Photographs and video on ARKive
 Skull image 
 Ageing and sexing (PDF) by Javier Blasco-Zumeta & Gerd-Michael Heinze
 Tree sparrow videos, photos & sounds on the Internet Bird Collection
 Feathers of the Eurasian tree sparrow 
 Documenting Passer montanus' nest, eggs, hatchlings, nestlings and fledglings by Isidro A.T. Savillo

Passer
Birds of Eurasia
Birds of Japan
Birds of Yunnan
Eurasian tree sparrow
Eurasian tree sparrow